Just You, Just Me is a 1994 album by Dave Brubeck. This album is the 3rd of Brubeck's solo works preceded by Brubeck Plays Brubeck and Plays and Plays and.... There was a 37-year gap between "Brubeck Plays and Plays" and this album with Brubeck focusing on working with his quartet during that time. Brubeck writes that for this album, "...I prefer to record in the same way as I play at home..." with all of the songs on this album being first takes with no advanced editing. The exception to this is "I Understand" of which Brubeck did three takes playing each in different ways.

Track listing
 "Just You, Just Me" (Jesse Greer) – 2:59
 "Strange Meadowlark" (Dave Brubeck) – 4:37
 "It's the Talk of the Town" (Marty Symes) – 4:14
 "Variations on Brother, Can You Spare a Dime?" – 7:27
 "Lullaby" (Dave Brubeck) – 5:08
 "Tribute to Stephen Foster"  – 6:10
 "I Married an Angel" – 4:11
 "Music, Maestro, Please!" – 5:03
 "Briar Bush" (Dave Brubeck) – 4:43
 "Newport Waltz" (Dave Brubeck) – 3:18
 "I Understand" – 3:37
 "More Than You Know" – 6:10

Personnel

Musicians
Dave Brubeck – Piano

Production
Recording Producer – Russell Gloyd and John Snyder
Recording Engineer – Jack Renner
Executive Producer – Robert Woods
Technical Assistance – Dave Cozzie, Robert Smith, Thomas Knab, and Scott Burgess
Editor – Jay Newland
Production Supervisor – Elaine Martone

References

1994 albums
Dave Brubeck albums
Solo piano jazz albums
Telarc Records albums